John James McCook (February 21, 1806 – October 11, 1865), was a patriarch of the Fighting McCooks, one of the most prolific families in United States Army history. Five of his sons became prominent soldiers, chaplains, or sailors, as well as eight of his nephews.

Biography
McCook was born in Canonsburg, Pennsylvania on February 21, 1806, to George and Mary McCormack McCook. He attended Jefferson College's medical school. His older brother Daniel, a local attorney, moved to eastern Ohio in 1826, settling in Carrollton. Not long afterward, John McCook also moved to the Buckeye State and established a practice in New Lisbon and later in Steubenville. He was married to Catherine Julia Sheldon, a native of Hartford, Connecticut. He was superintendent for several years of the Sunday School of the First Church of Steubenville. 

He served as a volunteer surgeon in the Union Army during the Civil War. He died just after its close at the headquarters of his son, General Anson G. McCook, in Washington, D.C., during a visit. McCook was buried at Union Cemetery in Steubenville beside his wife, who had preceded him in death by just seven months.

References

Whalen, Charles and Barbara, The Fighting McCooks: America's Famous Fighting Family, Westmoreland Press, 2006.
Howe's Historical Collections of Ohio, 1907.

1806 births
1865 deaths
McCook family
People from Canonsburg, Pennsylvania
Washington & Jefferson College alumni
People from Steubenville, Ohio
People of Ohio in the American Civil War
Union Army surgeons
Burials at Union Cemetery-Beatty Park